The Galle Gladiators (GG) is the franchise cricket team based in Galle, Southern Province, Sri Lanka which has been playing in the Lanka Premier League (LPL) since the first edition of the tournament in 2020. They was the five teams to compete in the 2022 Lanka Premier League. The team was captained by Kusal Mendis and coached by Moin Khan.

Current squad 
 Players with international caps are listed in bold.
  denotes a player who is currently unavailable for selection.
  denotes a player who is unavailable for rest of the season.

Administration and support staff

Teams and standings

Results by match

Points table

League stage

Playoffs

Eliminator

References

2022 Lanka Premier League
Galle Gladiators
2022 in Sri Lankan cricket